Khumbudzo Phophi Silence Ntshavheni (born 30 January 1977) is a South African politician serving as Minister in the Presidency since 2023. She has been a member of the National Assembly of South Africa since 2019. She served as Minister of Small Business Development from 2019 to 2021 and as Minister of Communications and Digital Technologies between 2021 and 2023. She is a member of the African National Congress.

Early life and education
Ntshavheni was born in the town of Sibasa in the Transvaal Province. Her mother worked in the taxi industry, while her father owned a general dealer's store. She matriculated at Mbilwi Secondary School and obtained an MBA degree from Bradford University in the United Kingdom in 2008. Her other qualifications include a BA Hons degree in Development Studies and a BA Hon degree in Labour Relations, both degrees achieved from the Rand Afrikaans University.

Career
She has work experience in the fields of Strategic Management, Information Technology, Change Management, and Communication and Marketing. She is also the founding Director and Chairwoman of Nkho Trading.

Ntshavheni served as the Municipal Manager of the Ba-Phalaborwa Local Municipality in Limpopo from 2008 to 2010. She previously served as the Tourism Manager at Trade and Investment Limpopo, Chief Information Officer for the Limpopo Provincial Department of Local Government and Housing, and Spokesperson for the Premier of Limpopo. She was also a lecturer at the University of South Africa and Chief Operating Officer at the State Information Technology Agency (SITA). In July 2015, she was appointed to the Board of Denel by Public Enterprises Minister Lynne Brown, in the role of non-executive director.

Ntshavheni is a member of the African National Congress Youth League's National Executive Committee (NEC). She is an active participant in many structures related to the interests of youths and the community. During April 2013, Ntshavheni was one of 22 persons appointed to an ANC National Task Team, tasked with rebuilding the ANC Youth League (ANCYL) structures from branch, regional and provincial levels.

Following her election to the National Assembly in May 2019, President Cyril Ramaphosa appointed her to the post of Minister of Small Business Development.

After the death of the Minister in the Presidency: Planning, Monitoring and Evaluation, Jackson Mthembu, in January 2021, Ntshavheni was appointed as his acting successor.

During a cabinet reshuffle on 5 August 2021, president Ramaphosa announced that Minister of Communications and Digital Technologies Stella Ndabeni-Abrahams and Ntshavheni would exchange ministerial positions. She served in the position until another cabinet reshuffle done by Ramaphosa in March 2023, in which she was appointed as Minister in the Presidency.

References

|-

|-

1977 births
Living people
South African Venda people
Members of the National Assembly of South Africa
Government ministers of South Africa
Women government ministers of South Africa
African National Congress politicians
Women members of the National Assembly of South Africa